The following list indicates when missionaries of the Church of Jesus Christ of Latter-day Saints (LDS Church) first preached in the territory of present-day countries.

Countries where LDS Church missionaries have not preached
Official LDS Church missionaries have never preached in the following countries and territories:

Additionally, LDS missionaries are currently not preaching in a number of countries where they have preached previously, including Israel/Palestine, Iran, Laos, Lebanon, and Syria.

References

Entries
Missionary